Sympistis stabilis, the brown sallow, is a species of moth in the family Noctuidae (the owlet moths).

The MONA or Hodges number for Sympistis stabilis is 10062.

References

Further reading

 
 
 

stabilis
Articles created by Qbugbot
Moths described in 1895